David Haughton may refer to:
 David Haughton (artist)
 David Haughton (basketball)